Branislav Atanacković (Serbian Cyrillic: Бранислав Атанацковић; born 5 August 1983) is a Serbian professional footballer who plays as a left-back.

Atanacković came through the youth system of Partizan, making two appearances for the first team in the 2004–05 season. He also played on loan for numerous clubs, such as Teleoptik, Budućnost Banatski Dvor and Mačva Šabac. Eventually, Atanacković spent the majority of his career with Smederevo, making over 100 competitive appearances for the club.

Honours
Dacia Chișinău
 Moldovan Super Cup: 2011

References

External links
 
 

Association football defenders
Expatriate footballers in Bosnia and Herzegovina
Expatriate footballers in Moldova
FC Dacia Chișinău players
First League of Serbia and Montenegro players
FK Borac Čačak players
FK Budućnost Banatski Dvor players
FK Mačva Šabac players
FK Partizan players
FK Slavija Sarajevo players
FK Smederevo players
FK Teleoptik players
Moldovan Super Liga players
Premier League of Bosnia and Herzegovina players
Serbian expatriate footballers
Serbian expatriate sportspeople in Bosnia and Herzegovina
Serbian expatriate sportspeople in Moldova
Serbian First League players
Serbian footballers
Serbian SuperLiga players
Sportspeople from Smederevo
1983 births
Living people